Juan Carlos Cisneros (born May 18, 1977 in Buenos Aires, Argentina) is a former Argentine footballer. He played for Clubs of Argentina, Chile, Bolivia and Paraguay.

Teams
  Deportivo Español 1997-1999
  Cipolletti 1999-2000
  Colo-Colo 2000
  San Martín de San Juan 2001
  Guaraní 2001-2002
  Ferro Carril Oeste 2002-2003
  Jorge Wilstermann 2004-2007
  Argentino de Rosario 2008

References
 
 Profile at Futbol XXI  

1977 births
Living people
Argentine footballers
Argentine expatriate footballers
C.D. Jorge Wilstermann players
Colo-Colo footballers
Club Guaraní players
Club Cipolletti footballers
Deportivo Español footballers
Ferro Carril Oeste footballers
San Martín de San Juan footballers
Chilean Primera División players
Expatriate footballers in Chile
Expatriate footballers in Bolivia
Expatriate footballers in Paraguay
Argentino de Rosario footballers
Association footballers not categorized by position
Footballers from Buenos Aires